Christine Riedtmann (born 1952) is a Swiss mathematician specializing in abstract algebra. She earned her PhD in 1978 from the University of Zurich under the supervision of Pierre Gabriel, and is a professor emeritus (since 2016) at the University of Bern.

In 2012–2013 she was president of the Swiss Mathematical Society.

Selected publications

References

Further reading
Interview with Riedtmann in the Berner Zeitung, February 19, 2015 (in German)

1952 births
Living people
20th-century Swiss mathematicians
21st-century Swiss mathematicians
Algebraists
Swiss women mathematicians
University of Zurich alumni
Academic staff of the University of Bern